Hayatullah (born 28 July 2000) is a Pakistani cricketer. He made his List A debut on 22 April 2016 for Khyber Pakhtunkhwa in the 2016 Pakistan Cup. He made his first-class debut for Federally Administered Tribal Areas in the 2018–19 Quaid-e-Azam Trophy on 11 October 2018.

References

External links
 

2000 births
Living people
Pakistani cricketers
Federally Administered Tribal Areas cricketers
Khyber Pakhtunkhwa cricketers
Place of birth missing (living people)